Torgsin were state-run hard-currency stores that operated in the USSR between 1931 and 1936.  Their name was an acronym of torgovlia s inostrantsami, "trade with foreigners."  Unlike the later Beryozka stores, Torgsin stores were open to all Soviet citizens, provided they had access to hard currency, gold, or jewels. Torgsin was established by the Sovnarkom chairman Vyacheslav Molotov's order of 5 July 1931 and disbanded on 1 February 1936.

See also 
 Insnab
 Intourist
 Eastern Bloc economies

References

External links 
 "Sklar's Stores," Time, November 9, 1931
 Short page on Torgsin stores from website devoted to Bulgakov's Master & Margarita
 Homepage of Prof. Elena Osokina of the University of South Carolina who is writing a book on Torgsins.

Hard currency shops in socialist countries
Retail companies of the Soviet Union